Ernest Howard Shepard  (10 December 1879 – 24 March 1976) was an English artist and book illustrator. He is known especially for illustrations of the anthropomorphic animal and soft toy characters in The Wind in the Willows and Winnie-the-Pooh.

Shepard's original 1926 illustrated map of the Hundred Acre Wood, which features in the opening pages of Winnie-the-Pooh (and also appears in the opening animation in the first Disney adaptation in 1966), sold for £430,000 ($600,000) at Sotheby's in London, setting a world record for book illustrations.

Career 

Shepard was born in St John's Wood, London, son of Henry Donkin Shepard, an architect, and Jessie Harriet, daughter of watercolour painter William Lee. Having shown some promise in drawing at St Paul's School, in 1897 he enrolled in the Heatherley School of Fine Art in Chelsea. After a productive year there, he attended the Royal Academy Schools, winning a Landseer scholarship in 1899 and a British Institute prize in 1900. There he met Florence Eleanor Chaplin, whom he married in 1904. By 1906 Shepard had become a successful illustrator, having produced work for illustrated editions of Aesop's Fables, David Copperfield, and Tom Brown's Schooldays, while at the same time working as an illustrator on the staff of Punch. The couple bought a house in London, but in 1905 moved to Shamley Green, near Guildford.

Shepard was a prolific painter, showing in a number of exhibitions. He exhibited at the Royal Society of Artists, Birmingham—a traditional venue for generic painters—as well as in the more radical atmosphere of Glasgow's Institute of Fine Arts, where some of the most innovative artists were on show. He was twice an exhibitor at the Walker Art Gallery in Liverpool, one of the largest provincial galleries in the country, and another at the Manchester Art Gallery, a Victorian institution later part of the public libraries. But at heart, Shepard was a Londoner, showing sixteen times at the Royal Academy on Piccadilly. His wife, who was also a painter, found a home in London's West End venue for her own modest output during a 25-year career.

In his mid-thirties when World War I broke out in 1914, Shepard received a commission as a second lieutenant in the Royal Garrison Artillery, an arm of the Royal Artillery. He was assigned to the 105th Siege Battery, which crossed to France in May 1916 and went into action at the Battle of the Somme.

By the autumn of 1916, Shepard started working for the Intelligence Department sketching the combat area within the view of his battery position. On 16 February 1917, he was made an acting captain whilst second-in-command of his battery, and briefly served as an acting major in late April and early May of that year during the Battle of Arras before reverting to acting captain. He was promoted to substantive lieutenant on 1 July 1917. Whilst acting as Captain, he was awarded the Military Cross. His citation read:

Later in 1917, the 105th Siege Battery participated in the final stages of the Battle of Passchendaele where it came under heavy fire and suffered a number of casualties. At the end of the year, it was sent to help retrieve a disastrous situation on the Italian Front, travelling by rail via Verona before coming into action on the Montello Hill.

Shepard missed the Second Battle of the Piave River in April 1918, being on leave in England (where he was invested with his MC by King George V at Buckingham Palace) and where he was attending a gunnery course. He was back in Italy with his battery for the victory at Vittorio Veneto. After the Armistice of Villa Giusti in November 1918, Shepard was promoted to acting major in command of the battery, and given the duty of administering captured enemy guns. Demobilisation began at Christmas 1918 and the 105th Siege Battery was disbanded in March 1919.

Throughout the war, he had been contributing to Punch. He was hired as a regular staff cartoonist in 1921 and became lead cartoonist in 1945. He was removed from this post in 1953 by Punch'''s new editor, Malcolm Muggeridge. His work was also part of the painting event in the art competition at the 1928 Summer Olympics.

Shepard was recommended to A. A. Milne in 1923 by another Punch staffer, E. V. Lucas. Milne initially thought Shepard's style was not what he wanted, but used him to illustrate the book of poems When We Were Very Young. Happy with the results, Milne then insisted Shepard illustrate Winnie-the-Pooh. Realising his illustrator's contribution to the book's success, the writer arranged for Shepard to receive a share of his royalties. Milne also inscribed a copy of Winnie-the-Pooh with the following personal verse:

{{Quote|<poem>
When I am gone,
Let Shepard decorate my tomb,
And put (if there is room)
Two pictures on the stone:
Piglet from page a hundred and eleven,
And Pooh and Piglet walking (157) ...
And Peter, thinking that they are my own,
Will welcome me to Heaven.
</poem>}}

Eventually Shepard came to resent "that silly old bear" as he felt that the Pooh illustrations overshadowed his other work.

Shepard modelled Pooh not on the toy owned by Milne's son Christopher Robin but on "Growler", a stuffed bear owned by his own son. (Growler no longer exists, having been given to his granddaughter Minnie Hunt and subsequently destroyed by a neighbour's dog.) His Pooh work is so famous that 300 of his preliminary sketches were exhibited at the Victoria and Albert Museum in 1969, when he was 90 years old.

A Shepard painting of Winnie the Pooh, believed to have been painted in the 1930s for a Bristol teashop, is his only known oil painting of the famous teddy bear. It was purchased at an auction for $243,000 in London late in 2000. The painting is displayed in the Pavilion Gallery at Assiniboine Park in Winnipeg, Manitoba, Canada, the city after which Winnie is named.

Shepard wrote two autobiographies: Drawn from Memory (1957) and Drawn From Life (1961).

In 1972, Shepard gave his personal collection of papers and illustrations to the University of Surrey. These now form the E.H. Shepard Archive.

Shepard was made an Officer of the Order of the British Empire in the 1972 Birthday Honours.

Personal life 

Shepard lived at Melina Place in St John's Wood and from 1955 in Lodsworth, West Sussex. He and Florence had two children, Graham (born 1907) and Mary (born 1909), who both became illustrators. Lt. Graham Shepard died when his ship HMS Polyanthus was sunk by German submarine U-952 in September 1943. Mary married E.V. Knox, the editor of Punch, and became known as the illustrator of the Mary Poppins series of children's books. Florence Shepard died in 1927. In November 1943 Shepard married Norah Carroll, a nurse at St Mary's Hospital, Paddington. They remained married until his death on 24 March 1976.  In 1966, he called the short film Winnie the Pooh and the Honey Tree a travesty.

Works illustrated 

 1924 – When We Were Very Young
 1925 – Playtime and Company; Holly Tree
 1926 – Winnie-the-Pooh; Everybody's Pepys
 1927 – Jeremy; Little One's Log; Let's Pretend; Now We Are Six; Fun and Fantasy
 1928 – The House at Pooh Corner; The Golden Age
 1930 – Everybody's Boswell; Dream Days
 1931 – The Wind in the Willows; Christmas Poems; Bevis; Mother Goose
 1932 – Sycamore Square
 1933 – Everybody's Lamb; The Cricket in the Cage
 1934 – Victoria Regina
 1935 – Perfume from Provence
 1936 – The Modern Struwwelpeter
 1937 – Golden Sovereign; Cheddar Gorge; As the Bee Sucks; Sunset House: More Perfume from Provence
 1939 – The Reluctant Dragon
 1941 – Gracious Majesty
 1948 – The Golden Age; Dream Days; Bertie's Escapade
 1949 – York
 1950 – Drover's Tale
 1951 – Enter David Garrick
 1953 – The Silver Curlew
 1954 – The Cuckoo Clock; Susan, Bill and the Wolf-Dog
 1955 – The Glass Slipper; Operation Wild Goose; Crystal Mountain; Frogmorton; The Brownies
 1955 – Mary in the Country
 1956 – The Islanders; The Pancake
 1956 – The Secret Garden
 1956 – Royal Reflections: Stories for Children
 1957 – Drawn from Memory; Briar Rose
 1958 – Old Greek Fairy Tales
 1959 – Tom Brown's School Days
 1960 – Noble Company
 1961 – Drawn from Life; Hans Andersen's Fairy Tales
 1965 – Ben and Brock
 1969 – The Wind in the Willows (colour re-illustration); The Pooh Cookbook (cover)
 1970 – Winnie the Pooh (colour re-illustration); The House at Pooh Corner (colour re-illustration)
 1971 – The Pooh Party Book (cover)

References

Primary sources

Secondary sources 

 Campbell, James, Shepard's War: E.H. Shepard, The Man who Drew Winnie-the-Pooh, London: LOM Art, 2015, .

Articles

External links 

 Biography of E. H. Shepard at classicpooh.net
 "The man who hated Pooh", Tim Benson, BBC News, 6 March 2006.
  Victoria and Albert Museum, London, exhibition "Winnie-the-Pooh: Exploring a Classic", December 2017 to 8 April 2018.
 

1879 births
1976 deaths
English Anglicans
English illustrators
Winnie-the-Pooh
Punch (magazine) cartoonists
Officers of the Order of the British Empire
Recipients of the Military Cross
Royal Garrison Artillery officers
British Army personnel of World War I
People from St John's Wood
Artists from London
British children's book illustrators
People educated at Colet Court
Alumni of the Heatherley School of Fine Art
Alumni of the Royal Academy Schools
Olympic competitors in art competitions
People from Lodsworth